The Jade Coast constitutes the coastal fringe of the Pays de Retz in Loire-Atlantique, extending from the Loire estuary in the north to the Marais breton in the south, thus bordering the Bay of Bourgneuf on its southern part. Its jagged coasts and its numerous beaches are of summer tourist interest.

Description
There is a notable disparity between the coasts north and south of Pointe Saint-Gildas.

To the north, from Mindin (Saint-Brevin-les-Pins) to Cormier (La Plaine-sur-Mer) stretch long fine sandy beaches with vast foreshores, bordered by pine-wooded dunes or low cliffs.

To the south, from La Plaine-sur-Mer to La Bernerie-en-Retz, the coast is wilder and presents a succession of coves and more or less reduced beaches, separated by rocky areas with larger schist cliffs. These then fade into the mudflats, salt marshes and polders of the  around Les Moutiers-en-Retz.

Development
Tourism in the Pays de Retz developed from the late 17th century with the fashion for therapeutic bathing leading to the development of beach facilities in Pornic.

Toponymy
The Côte de Jade was named from jade-green colours of the sea during the expansion of tourism during the 1930s.

Resorts
The principal resorts of the Côte de Jade are:
 Saint-Brevin-les-Pins
 Saint-Michel-Chef-Chef
 Tharon-Plage
 La Plaine-sur-Mer 
 Préfailles
 Sainte-Marie-sur-Mer
 Pornic
 La Bernerie-en-Retz
 Les Moutiers-en-Retz.

References

External links

Seaside resorts in France
Landforms of Loire-Atlantique
Coasts of France